The 2020 Limerick Senior Hurling Championship was the 126th staging of the Limerick Senior Hurling Championship since its establishment by the Limerick County Board in 1887. The original championship draw took place on 16 December 2019, however, due to the COVID-19 pandemic the draws for a rescheduled championship took place on 24 June 2020 with a new format being adopted. The championship began on 23 July 2020 and ended on 19 September 2020.

Patrickswell were the defending champions, however, they were beaten by Na Piarsaigh at the semi-final stage. Murroe-Boher were relegated after suffering a 0-24 to 1-17 defeat by Garryspillane in a playoff.

On 19 September 2020, Na Piarsaigh won the championship after a 5-27 to 1-12 victory over Doon in the final at the LIT Gaelic Grounds. It was their sixth championship title overall and their first title since 2018.

Ballybrown's Andrew Cliffe was the championship's top scorer with 3-31.

Revised format

The championship was redrawn to consist of four groups of three teams. The six teams that were drawn in the original format in each section group 1 and 2 were split into two further groups. The redrawn groups were decided based on 2019 championship results.

Section A

The top team in each group in Section A to qualify for the championship semi-finals. 
The second team in each group in Section A qualify for the championship quarter-finals. 
The bottom team in each group to play in the relegation final for Group 2 in the 2021 championship.

Section B

The top team in each group in Section B qualify for the championship quarter-finals (draw will be seeded).
The bottom team in each group in Section B to play in the relegation final for the Premier Intermediate Championship in 2021.
The top team in each group in Section B to qualify for the promotion final to Section A for the 2021 season.
If a team from Section B wins the championship they will automatically be promoted to Section A for the 2021 season and no promotion final will be necessary.

Team changes

To Championship

Promoted from the Limerick Premier Intermediate Hurling Championship
 Blackrock

From Championship

Relegated to the Limerick Premier Intermediate Hurling Championship
 Knockainey

Fixtures/results

Section A

Group 1 table

Group 1 results

Group 2 table

Group 2 results

Relegation final

Section B

Group 1 table

Group 1 results

Group 2 table

Group 2 results

Promotion final

Knock-out stage

Relegation final

Quarter-finals

Semi-finals

Final

Championship statistics

Top scorers

Overall

In a single game

References

Limerick Senior Hurling Championship
Limerick Senior Hurling Championship
Limerick Senior Hurling Championship